The spotted halibut (Verasper variegatus) is a flatfish of the family Pleuronectidae. Its native habitat is the northwestern Pacific, from Japan to Korea and the East China Sea.

References

spotted halibut
Marine fauna of East Asia
spotted halibut